Pultenaea brachytropis is a species of flowering plant in the family Fabaceae and is endemic to the south-west of Western Australia. It is an erect, spindly shrub with more or less cylindrical, grooved leaves and yellow, red and orange flowers.

Description
The flowers are yellow, red and orange with mulitcoloured marks. Flowering occurs from September to November and the fruit is an oval pod.

Taxonomy and naming
Pultenaea brachytropis was first formally described in 1841 in the Edwards's Botanical Register from a manuscript by George Bentham. The type specimens are from plants grown by James Mangles from seeds collected by Georgiana Molloy. The specific epithet (brachytropis) means "short-keeled", referring to the keel being much shorter than the wings.

Distribution and habitat
This pultenaea grows on slopes, ridges and along creeks in the Jarrah Forest, Swan Coastal Plain and Warren biogeographic regions in the south-west of Western Australia.

Conservation status
Pultenaea brachytropis is classified as "not threatened" by the Western Australian Government Department of Parks and Wildlife.

References

brachyphylla
Eudicots of Western Australia
Taxa named by George Bentham
Plants described in 1841